Lindås is a former municipality in the Nordhordland district in the old Hordaland county, Norway. It existed from 1838 until its dissolution on 1 January 2020 when it was merged into the new Alver Municipality. The administrative centre of the municipality was the village of Knarvik, located in the southwestern part of the municipality. Other notable villages in the municipality included Alversund, Isdalstø, Lindås, Ostereidet, and Seim. The Mongstad industrial area in extreme northern Lindås has one of the largest oil refineries and largest seaports in Norway. The oil refinery at Mongstad is by far the largest employer in the municipality.

Prior to its dissolution in 2020, the  municipality is the 213th largest by area out of the 422 municipalities in Norway. Lindås is the 75th most populous municipality in Norway with a population of 15,731.

General information

The parish of Lindaas was established as a municipality on 1 January 1838 (see formannskapsdistrikt law). On 1 March 1879, the northeastern district of Lindaas was separated to form the new Masfjorden Municipality, leaving 6,374 inhabitants in Lindaas. On 1 January 1910, the northwestern island district of Lindaas was separated to form the new Austrheim Municipality. This left Lindaas with 4,433 residents.

During the 1960s, there were many municipal mergers across Norway due to the work of the Schei Committee. On 1 January 1964, the following places were merged into one large municipality of Lindås:
The Nipo, Dyrkelbotn, and Eitrdalen farms (population: 12) in extreme western Modalen Municipality
All of Hosanger Municipality located north of the Osterfjorden (population: 791) 
All of Hamre Municipality located north of the Osterfjorden (population: 1,240)
The whole Alversund Municipality (population: 2,099)
The Titland area (population: 40) from Sæbø Municipality, northwest of the village of Seim
All of the old municipality of Lindås (population: 3,651)
Also on this date, there were two other changes. The Sletta area (population: 305) on the island of Radøy was switched from Lindås to the new Radøy Municipality. The other change was the Einestrand, Eikebotn, and Kikallen areas (population: 25) was transferred from Lindås to Modalen Municipality.

On 1 January 2020, the neighboring municipalities of Meland, Radøy, and Lindås were merged the large new municipality of Alver.

Name
The municipality (originally the parish) is named after the old Lindås farm, since the first Lindås Church was built there. The first element is lindi which means "linden (Tilia) wood" and the last element is áss which means "mountain ridge". Before 1921, the name was written "Lindaas".

Coat of arms
The coat of arms was granted on 4 May 1979. The arms show a silver colored linden tree on a red background. They are a canting arms since the name of the municipality refers to a linden tree.

Churches
The Church of Norway had eight parishes within the municipality of Lindås. It is part of the Nordhordland prosti (deanery) in the Diocese of Bjørgvin.

Government
All municipalities in Norway, including Lindås, are responsible for primary education (through 10th grade), outpatient health services, senior citizen services, unemployment and other social services, zoning, economic development, and municipal roads. The municipality is governed by a municipal council of elected representatives, which in turn elect a mayor.  The municipality falls under the Bergen District Court and the Gulating Court of Appeal.

Municipal council
The municipal council  of Lindås was made up of 31 representatives that are elected to four year terms. The party breakdown of the final municipal council was as follows:

History
{{Historical populations
|footnote = Source: Statistics Norway.
|shading = off
|1951|4121  	  	  	
|1960|4084  	  	
|1970|7776    	  	  	  	  	  	
|1980|10099  	  	  	 	
|1990|11861  	
|2000|12492 	  	  	  	
|2010|14286 	  	
|2017|15731  	  	  	  	  	
}}
Ancient settlements of Vikings are found in several places. At Lindås there are stories of monks coming from England and living with the Viking population.

Håkonshaugen (from Old Norse haugr meaning mound) at the village of Seim is the burial mound  of King Haakon the Good, the third king of Norway. King Haakon was mortally wounded in 961 at the Battle of Fitjar at nearby Stord. Håkonshaugen is the millennium site in the municipality of Lindås.

The historical play  Håkonarspelet ("King with the golden helmet") is performed here every year. The play is one of several plays written by author Johannes Heggland. The play was written in five parts between 1995 and 1996. It centers on events in the life of King Haakon the Good and the king's only daughter, Thora.Håkonarspelet (Culturenet.no) 

Geography
Lindås municipality was located mostly on the mainland of the Nordhordland region, just north of the city of Bergen. The municipality was north of the Osterfjorden and Romarheimsfjorden. The Lindås peninsula heads north from there. The peninsula juts out west of the Austfjorden, south of the Fensfjorden, and east of the Radfjorden. The municipality includes the very southernmost tip of the neighboring island of Radøy as well as the island of Luro. The Lurefjorden cuts into the middle of the peninsula. On the east side of the municipality, lies a mountainous area that is sparsely populated.

The municipality was surrounded by water on three sides, and the fourth side is mountainous, so there are few road connections to Lindås. On the east side, the municipality is accessible by the Eikefet Tunnel, part of the European route E39 highway. On the southwest side, the Hagelsund Bridge crosses the fjord to connect to the municipalities of Bergen and Meland to the southwest. The Alversund Bridge on the west side connects Lindås to the island municipality of Radøy. The municipality of Austrheim lies to the north, and it includes a small part of the mainland Lindås peninsula, so there is road access there too.

Attractions
Lindås Church
Lindås Church (Lindås kirke) was consecrated 20 September 1865. The church was built just west of where the old stone church stood. The architect was Ole Syslak who was responsible for the construction of several other churches in western Norway. The church received its first church organ in 1906, which was replaced in 1978 with an organ built by Josef Hilmar Jørgensen. The church has two church bells. The oldest clock was made by Laxevaag Værk in Bergen in 1865, while the other was made by O. Olsen & Son in Tønsberg in 1955.

The first time a church in Lindås mentioned was in 1315. This was a stone altar, which stood under the open sky. Walls were erected later, so that the priest was standing under a roof, while the audience stood on the ground outside and listened. Later  walls were raised so that the church was under roof. This church was extended in 1600 and repaired in the 1700s.

Heathland Centre at Lygra

Heathland Centre at Lygra (Lyngheisenteret på Lygra'') is a cultural museum consisting of a conserved heather moorland. It is also an information centre for the coastal heathlands. The center was established in the 1970s. An information center with a restaurant, auditorium, and permanent exhibition was opened in 2000. Heathland was founded by the University of Bergen, Vestland county, Lindås Municipality, the Regional Council in Nordhordland and Gulen. It is administrated by the Museum Centre in Hordaland.

Notable residents

See also
List of former municipalities of Norway

References

External links

Municipal fact sheet from Statistics Norway 
Lindås Kommune website
Tour Nordhordland, Masfjorden
Culture in Lindås on maps from Kulturnett.no
Heathland Centre at Lygra

 
Alver (municipality)
Former municipalities of Norway
1838 establishments in Norway
2020 disestablishments in Norway